Frank Van Den Abeele (born 3 January 1966 in Aalst) is a Belgian former professional cyclist. He rode in the 1991 Tour de France and 1995 Giro d'Italia.

Major results

1990
3rd Grand Prix de Cannes
3rd National Road Race Championships
3rd Tour de Berne
1991
1st Stage 4 Vuelta a Galicia
1st Grand Prix de Wallonie
1st Circuit des Frontières
3rd Grand Prix du Midi Libre
3rd Three Days of West Flanders
1992
1st Eschborn–Frankfurt City Loop
2nd Grand Prix de Rennes
10th La Flèche Wallonne
1993
1st Omloop Mandel-Lys-Scheldt
3rd Circuit des Frontières
1996
3rd Overall Tour de Bretagne
1st Stage 4
5th Tour de Vendée

References

1966 births
Living people
Belgian male cyclists
Sportspeople from Aalst, Belgium
Cyclists from East Flanders